Bold is a laundry detergent brand owned by Procter & Gamble.

History 
Bold was originally introduced in the United States in 1965, and was launched in 1974 as the UK's first low suds biological detergent. In 1982, it was relaunched as the country's only combined detergent/conditioner, and has been a popular product since. 

In 2004, the Bold 2in1 detergent/conditioner product was given a packaging revamp.

References

Procter & Gamble brands
Laundry detergents
Products introduced in 1974
Consumer goods
Cleaning products